The national parks of France are a system of eleven national parks throughout metropolitan France and its overseas departments, coordinated by National Parks of France (French: Parcs nationaux de France) within the French Office for Biodiversity (Office français pour la biodiversité), an établissement public à caractère administratif guided by the Ministry of Ecological Transition and Ministry of Agriculture and Food.

The first national park was established in 1963; the most recent park was established in 2019. National parks are created by decree with the signature of the Prime Minister of France and publication in the Journal Officiel de la République Française.

This puts over 9.5% of French territory under the protection of national parks; 29.5% of French lands and 22% of French waters are covered by some level of protection. French national parks draw over 8.5 million visitors annually.


List

See also 
Regional natural parks of France
List of national parks in the Alps
Tourism in France

References

External links 
 Parcs Nationaux de France
National Parks and other Protected Areas

France
 
National parks
National parks